Established in 1998, the FAB Awards is an international awards program which focuses on food and beverage brands.

Some of the brands that have won the FAB Award include McDonald's, Coca-Cola, Skittles, James Ready Beer, Heineken and Arla Foods.

Agencies that have previously won the FAB plate include BBDO, JWT, Leo Burnett, DDB, McCann Erickson, Razorfish, TBWA, Ogilvy & Mather, Lewis Moberly, Design Bridge, Pearlfisher, Landor, Turner Duckworth and Williams Murray Hamm.

Awards 

The Hurlingham Club in London has hosted the FAB Awards ceremony for all 21 years of its existence.

The ceremony, which usually takes place in May, is a formal black tie event that includes dinner and drinks. It is attended by nominees, industry personalities, past judges and other select invitees.

The ceremony showcases all the nominated work and hands out the awards to the respective winners. From 2016 onward all nominees were awarded Silver Awards.

There are two types of awards to be won on the night:

FAB Award 

This is equivalent to a 'Gold' in other major award ceremonies. There can be multiple FABs across a single category.

FABulous Award 

These are the grand winners on the night and are awarded over a family of categories, such as, Traditional Advertising (TV, Press, Posters, etc.) or Digital Advertising (Online, Website, Social Media, Viral, etc.)

A project must have won a FAB Award on the night to be considered for a FABulous Award.

FAB Brand of the Year 

Introduced in 2013, this award is handed out to the brand that fares the best in the judging session. This includes the number of nominations, FAB and FABulous Awards it wins. This is also the only award that is announced before the actual awards ceremony. In 2015 and 2016, this award was sponsored by Google UK, with YouTube sponsoring it in 2017 and 2018.

Previous winners

FAB Agency of the Year 

Similar to the Brand of the Year Award, this award is given to the agency that performed the best during the judging session. The award was introduced for the first time in 2000. This award was also sponsored by Google UK in 2015 and 2016, with YouTube sponsoring it in 2017 and 2018.

Points are handed out for nominations, FAB Awards and FABulous Awards. The agency that amasses the most points is named Agency of the Year.

Previous winners 

The following are the agencies that have won the Agency of the Year Award:

FAB Design Agency of the Year 

Similar to the Agency of the Year Award, this award is given to the design house that performed the best during the judging session. The award was introduced for the first time in 2016.

Points are handed out for nominations, FAB Awards and FABulous Awards. The agency that amasses the most points is named Design Agency of the Year.

Previous winners 

The following are the design houses that have won the Design Agency of the Year Award:

FAB Food Fight 

In 2013, The FAB Awards along with WCRS published seven print ads to promote the 15th edition of the awards. That was the first time FAB ran an advertising campaign to promote the event.

The campaign is the brainchild or former FAB winner and WCRS creative Naz Nazli. Nazli came up with the idea while judging the awards in 2011.

Full credits for the campaign:

Agency: WCRS
Copywriter: Naz Nazli & Rob Welch
Art Director: Naz Nazli & Rob Welch
Creative Director: Billy Faithfull
Photographer: Andy Gallacher
Post Production: Joanne Stubbs, Andy Gallacher & Tomek Drozdowski
Design: Tomek Drozdowski, Stein Olsen , Felipe Faudez & Daniel Atkinson
Stylist-Make Up: Bridget Lee
Client: The FAB Awards

The full campaign can be seen here.

20 Years Young Campaign 

To mark their 20th Anniversary, The FAB Awards unveiled a new campaign by Creative Directors, Naz Nazli and Alex Ball with the tag line: “20 Years Young”.

Photographed by Andy Gallacher, it features some of the leading personalities from the Marketing, Design and Advertising Industry, who have either picked up the FAB plate or have judged the programme during its 20-year history.

The likes of Mary Lewis, Rodanthi Senduka, Graham Shearsby, Rosie Arnold, Bjorn Stahl, Peter Ignazi, Russell Ramsey, Karen Welman, Garrick Hamm, Paul Brazier, Donald Gunn and Michael Conrad (to name a few) are showcased in their youthful splendour, highlighting FAB's continued support from the cream of the Marketing, Design and Advertising Industry.

Full credits for the campaign:

Creative Directors: Naz Nazli & Alex Ball
Copywriter & Art Direction: Naz Nazli & Alex Ball
Photographer: Andy Gallacher
Post Production: Andy Gallacher & Joanne Stubbs
Typography: Casa Hamid

The full campaign can be seen here.

References 

Food and drink awards
Awards established in 1998
Innovation